Direct Energy LP is a North American retailer of energy and energy services. The company was founded in Toronto in 1986 and now has more than four million customers in Canada and the United States. Direct Energy is a subsidiary of NRG Energy.

History

Direct Energy was founded in Toronto in 1986, as a competitive energy retailer. In 2000, the company was acquired by Centrica, the UK-based parent of British energy retailer British Gas.

In 2010, Direct Energy acquired Clockwork Home Services making Direct Energy the largest energy and home services retailer in North America. Clockwork has three brands: One Hour Air Conditioning & Heating, Benjamin Franklin Plumbing and Mister Sparky, which specialize in plumbing, electrical and air-conditioning and heating and services, all of which have earned the Diamond Certified Award for excellent service.

Direct Energy acquired a number of upstream assets, including gas reserves and power generation facilities. These include: Quintana Minerals Resources, Bastrop Energy Center, Frontera Energy Center, Paris Energy Center, and Rockyview Energy Inc. Direct Energy has entered into long-term power purchase agreements for 813 MW of electricity from five wind farms in Texas.

Direct Energy owns and operates approximately 4,600 natural gas wells in Alberta, most recently acquiring natural gas assets from Suncor Energy and Shell Canada.

The company’s new strategy calls for increased investment in North America, specifically to grow its upstream asset cover to 35-40%; it also plans to grow its downstream businesses in its core markets of Texas, US North East and Canada.
Chris Weston became President & CEO of Direct Energy on July 1, 2009 following the retirement of Deryk King.

Direct Energy announced in January 2012 that it will move its corporate headquarters from Toronto to Houston within the next 12 to 18 months. The headquarters will be in the Greenway Plaza location where the company's residential energy and upstream business are now based.

In 2012, Iberdrola USA sold its energy services companies, Energetix and NYSEG Solutions, to Direct Energy.

In early 2014, Direct Energy partnered with Nest Labs to create a plan that would include a smart thermostat. The Nest smart thermostat will increase home owners and renters ability to monitor the temperature of their homes for increased energy efficiency. In August 2014, Direct Energy increased their ability to provide services that increase the efficiency of the American and Canadian home when its announced its partnership with SmartThings. A SmartThing's Hub allows the user to connect with smart device, secure the home with sensors, and control certain electrical devices.

In November 2015, the company acquired Israeli startup Panoramic Power, a manufacturer of circuit level wireless sensors that collect energy information, for $60M.

In July 2020, NRG Energy and Centrica entered an agreement under which NRG would acquire Direct Energy for $3.625 billion in an all-cash transaction. The merge was completed on January 5, 2021.

Products and services
Direct Energy’s U.S. operations span 46 states and the District of Columbia including Texas, Ohio, Michigan, Illinois, Pennsylvania, California, Connecticut, Maryland, Rhode Island, Maine, New York, New Jersey, Delaware, Massachusetts, Florida, North Carolina, Kentucky, Indiana, Alabama, Oklahoma and Virginia. While not providing services to residential customers and businesses in Oklahoma, Direct Energy has established an Operations Center in Tulsa. In Canada, Direct Energy has operations in Ontario, Alberta, British Columbia, Manitoba, Quebec, Saskatchewan, Nova Scotia, Prince Edward Island, New Brunswick, and Newfoundland and Labrador.

For residential customers and small business, Direct Energy offers fixed price electricity and gas plans, as an alternative to the local utility or in competition with the local competitive energy providers. In Texas, Direct Energy offers a pre-paid electricity plan, Power-To-Go. In Ontario, Direct Energy rents water heaters to around 600,000 residential homeowners. Through its services division, Direct Energy installs and services heating, ventilating and air conditioning equipment. It also can perform energy retrofits and other energy management projects at larger facilities. Direct Energy’s Home and Business Services division employs over 1,400 technicians providing residential customers with heating, ventilation and air conditioner (HVAC), plumbing, home improvements, water heater and electrical appliance services.

Direct Energy is a regulated gas and electricity provider in Alberta, operating under the Direct Energy Regulated Services brand. It also offers deregulated service in the Province, operating as Direct Energy.

In South Texas, Direct Energy operates as CPL Retail Energy and CPL Business.

In West Texas, Direct Energy operates as WTU Retail Energy and WTU Business.

In Texas, additional brands of Direct Energy are First Choice Power, Bounce Energy.

Community investment

Direct Energy encourages volunteerism within their organization through internal company policies, award programs, and grants. 
Direct Energy encourages their employees to take their first step into community involvement by offering one paid volunteer day a year. Interested employees can choose a charity or organization to lend their expertise.

Volunteer Citizen of the Year
The Volunteer Citizen of the Year award program allows citizens to nominate individuals or organizations who have through volunteer work made their community better. The winner can choose a charity to receive $5000. Last year, the award went to Paul Garrett for his efforts towards cleaning his community and encouraging sustainable practices. Garret chose to give the donation to the Mechanicsburg Area School District's Trails and Trees Environmental Center.

Reduce Your Use For Good
The Reduce Your Use For Good grant program was created to help organizations increase the energy efficiency of their program or products. In the past the grant has allowed various organization to increase efficiency. In the past the grant was awarded to a Pittsburgh community food bank, Medina Creative Housing, and Animal Protectors of Allegheny Valley.

Deregulation position
Former CEO Chris Weston has given several speeches stating the need for deregulation of the energy market and the need for consumers to pay the actual price for energy rather than what he considers its current artificially low position. Weston spoke at KEMA’s 21st Executive Forum on the benefits of a competitive energy market and the value it has to consumers. He has also authored opinion pieces on the subject.

Controversies

Sales employee oversight
May 2004 - Direct Energy was fined $157,500 CAD in 2003 after investigators discovered 25 of their sales agents were forging contracts to trap Ontario and US citizens into long-term energy contracts. After the forgeries committed by sales employees were discovered, Direct Energy president Paul Massara reported that "action [was taken to] deal with these issues and we've moved on a long way since that time."

May 2009 - Some Direct Energy sales people failed to make it clear to customers that they were signing up for unregulated energy rates. In order to prevent this issue from continuing, Direct Energy worked with the Service Alberta to train staff and implement practices that would prevent sales people from purposefully or accidentally misleading citizens about energy plans. The company was fined over $5,000 in penalties for the damages caused by the negligence. The Ontario government has since passed a bill that would require energy retailers to follow up on each contract sold to ensure the customer had willingly made the purchase which should allow energy companies to ensure that customers were not swayed by unethical sales pitches.

Water Heater Rental Contracts
March 2012 - Direct Energy, Reliance Comfort, and other water heater customers allegedly created water heater contracts with high exit fees, long term contracts, and high buyout charges to make it difficult for current customers to switch suppliers. In November 2012, federal Competition Bureau began looking into whether water heater companies are currently engaging in anti-competitive practices.

Late Penalties
March 2014 - An Alberta judge has certified a class action lawsuit against Direct Energy alleging the company violated the Criminal Code and Canada's Interest Act. The lawsuit alleges Direct Energy's late payment penalties were effectively charging customers a 91 percent interest rate on late payments. The class action is still in process.

See also 
Deregulation of the Texas electricity market
Electric Reliability Council of Texas (ERCOT)
Electricity policy of Ontario
Universal Energy Corporation

References

External links

The Direct Sell Calgary Herald Special Report on Direct Energy

1986 establishments in Ontario
2000 mergers and acquisitions
American subsidiaries of foreign companies
Canadian subsidiaries of foreign companies
Companies based in Houston
NRG Energy
Electric power companies of Canada
Energy companies established in 1986
Energy companies of Canada
Energy companies of the United States
2020 mergers and acquisitions